Graham Beighton (born 1 July 1939) is an English former professional footballer who played as a goalkeeper. He made appearances in the English Football League with Stockport County and Wrexham.

References

1939 births
Living people
English footballers
Association football goalkeepers
Sheffield Wednesday F.C. players
Stockport County F.C. players
Wrexham A.F.C. players
English Football League players
Footballers from Sheffield
Graham has 2 sons named Mark Beighton and Peter Beighton.